Events from the year 1631 in art.

Events
Rembrandt moves to the home of Hendrick van Uylenburgh at Sint Antoniesbreestraat in Amsterdam.

Works

 Willem Claesz Heda - Still lifes
 Judith Leyster - The Rejected Offer
 Nicolas Poussin - Kingdom of Flora
 Rembrandt
Presentation in the Temple (usually called "Simeon in the Temple"), the earliest important composition of the artist known
Simeon's Song of Praise
Christ Alone
The Crucifixion
Self portrait in a soft hat and embroidered cloak (etching)
 José de Ribera - Landscape (Hospital de Tavera, Toledo, Spain)
 Nicholas Stone - funerary monuments (London)
 John Donne (Old St Paul's Cathedral)
 Sir George Villiers and the Countess of Buckingham (Westminster Abbey)
 Francisco de Zurbarán - Apotheosis of Saint Thomas Aquinas

Births
March 3 - Esaias Boursse, Dutch painter of genre works (died 1672)
April - Cornelis de Heem, still-life painter associated with both Flemish Baroque and Dutch Golden Age painting (died 1695)
November 28 - Abraham Brueghel, Flemish painter from the famous Brueghel family of artists (died 1690)
date unknown
Germain Audran, French engraver (died 1710)
Benjamin Block, German–Hungarian painter known for his portrait paintings (died 1690)
Adriaen van der Cabel, Dutch painter (died 1705)
Pompeo Ghitti, Italian painter of frescoes (died 1703/1704)
Bernard Lens I, Dutch painter and writer of religious treatises (died 1707)
Antonio Zanchi, Italian painter of canvases for churches in Venice (died 1722)
probable - Cornelis Pietersz Bega (the "Little Master"), Dutch painter, etcher and draughtsman (died 1664)

Deaths
January 20 - Jacob Matham, Dutch engraver and pen-draftsman (born 1571)
March 28 - Juan van der Hamen, Spanish still life painter (born 1596)
April 5 - Sinibaldo Scorza, Italian painter, draughtsman and etcher (born 1589)
June 10 - Giovanni Serodine, Italian painter in Caravaggisti and tenebrist styles (born 1600)
August - Arent Arentsz, Dutch painter (born 1585)
October 11 - Marten Ryckaert, Flemish painter (born 1587)
c. November 5 - Johann Liss, German-born painter (born c. 1597)
December - Jan Pynas, Dutch painter (born 1583)
December 10 - Orazio Riminaldi, Italian Caravaggisti painter (born 1586)
date unknown
Matteo Ingoli, Italian painter (born 1587)
Gregorius Sickinger, Swiss painter, draughtsman, and engraver (born 1558)
Jan Tengnagel, Dutch painter (born 1584)
Pieter van der Borcht, Flemish painter (born 1604)
Tobias Verhaecht, Landscape painter and draughtsman in Italy and Antwerp (born 1561)

References

 
Years of the 17th century in art
1630s in art